Arthur Gregory Harrison was an author, lawyer and civil engineer who served as City Commissioner of the City of Edmonton in Canada from 1911 until 1918. He subsequently became President (and later secretary) of the Edmonton Exhibition Association.

Background 
Harrison was born in Fredericton, New Brunswick in 1870. He graduated from the University of New Brunswick in 1891 with a degree in civil engineering.

Career 
Following his graduation from the University of New Brunswick, Harrison sought employment with the Ohio and Pennsylvania Railroad in 1891. From 1899 until 1911 he worked as a land agent with the Dominion Lands Branch in Canada. From 1911 until 1918, Harrison served as City Commissioner in Edmonton.

Personal life 
Harrison married Florence Amanda Jackson in 1902 in Calgary, Alberta. Together they had one son and four daughters. Between 1902 until 1920, Harrison and his family resided at 10529 99 Avenue in Edmonton, Alberta. Harrison became a widower in 1942 following the passing of his wife Florence on 27 June.

Bibliography 
 Guide to the Omenica, Cassier, Liard, Klondyke and Yukon Gold Fields via the Edmonton Route (1897) - 
 Report of the Commission on the Pork Industry in the Province of Alberta (1909) - 
 The Gairdner Harrison Prospector's Guide (reprint 2015) -

Notes

References

External links 
 Arthur G. Harrison gravestone on Find A Grave

1870 births
1954 deaths
Settlers of Canada
19th-century Canadian politicians
Politicians from Fredericton